Homer Bates Chase (c. 1917 – August 29, 1985) was an activist in the American Communist Party. He was the head of the Georgia Communist Party in the 1940s.

Early life

Chase's ancestors first arrived in America in the 1600s. His parents, Fred B. and Elba Chase, were leaders in the American Communist Party in New Hampshire. Chase was born in Washington, New Hampshire. Chase fought for the Republicans in the Lincoln Battalion in the Spanish Civil War. He also fought in World War II.

Communist activism
During the 1940s, Chase was the head of the Communist Party in Georgia. He participated in the early civil rights movement, campaigning for black people's right to vote. While in Georgia, Chase was arrested after threatening to harm a 20-year-old member of the Communist Party if he divulged information regarding the party's operations. He was defended by Klansman James Venable. In the late 1950s, he was section organizer for the New England party branch. In the 1960s, Chase denounced President Kennedy's foreign policy as a threat to world peace.

Personal life
Chase had four daughters: Norah, Hannah Bates Cowen, Claudette Chase, and Rebecca Jo Kyle. He also had a son, Leonard Foster Chase.

Death
Chase died in his sleep at his home in Hingham, Massachusetts, on August 29, 1985.

References

External links
 The Papers of Elba Chase Nelson at Dartmouth College Library

1985 deaths
Members of the Communist Party USA
Year of birth uncertain